The Murray River road bridge, Murray Bridge is a bridge in the town of Murray Bridge, located  south-east of Adelaide on the Murray River north of Lake Alexandra. The bridge was built as a road bridge in 1879 and converted for mixed road/rail use shortly thereafter. The tiny settlement of Edwards Crossing was renamed Murray Bridge when a new railway bridge was constructed in 1924. Since then, the bridge has been used for road traffic only.

Heritage Listing 
The Murray River road bridge, Murray Bridge is classified by the National Trust. It has a Status Code of “REG - Confirmed as a State Heritage Place in the SA Heritage Register”, Status Date 28-MAY-1981. It's Reference is LGA Murray Bridge, State Heritage ID 10287, Heritage Number 14191. Plan Parcel & Title Information CT 0000/0000 H750200 RIVER MURRAY,CT 0000/0000 H170700 RIVER MURRAY,CT 6105/13 D33894 A9,CR 6105/15 H750200 S709.

History 
It was used by trains for 40 years and during that time toll gates were installed to control other traffic across the bridge. The bridge became a shared road and rail bridge in 1886 and remained so until 1925 when a separate railway bridge was built. An article in the Adelaide Observer of Saturday 22 March 1879 stated that “The Murray Bridge deserves more than a passing notice, as it is the largest and at the same time the mostly costly undertaking of its kind that has been erected in the Australian Colonies, including New Zealand.”

The political history of the bridge extended through several sessions of Parliament starting in 1861 when a Committee of the House of Assembly recommended that if a suitable bridge could be erected at a cost not exceeding £20,000 the required amount should be included in the Estimates for the following session. The structure had to be specially adapted for the transit of cattle and sheep.

Description 

Superintendent, Mr. H. Parker, arrived from England in June 1874, with his apparatus and commenced the work of placing the remaining piers in position.

It was a work of some considerable difficulty and danger, and to estimate the cost with the insufficient data at hand was very hazardous. The bridge piers, now increased to five in number, were sunk thirty feet deeper and raised ten feet higher, to suit the steamers, than the section of the river sent to England in 1865 indicated.

The river spans were five in number, each being  in the clear, and constructed on the Warren principle. They were built by Messrs. Kennard Brothers, of the Crumlin Works, South Wales, and were a fine sample of first-class bridge work. The main girders are connected together laterally by cross girders, which were originally made on the lattice principle, but not being strong enough to sustain the weight of a railway train they were taken to pieces and reconstructed of plate and angle irons. The bridge is floored with Malletts buckle plates, upon which the asphalt and road metal is carried.

The main girders rested on masonry bed-stones, which were supported by the cement concrete with which the cast-iron piers are filled, the piers in each instance having been sunk down to the bed-rock granite. They were composed of cast-iron cylinders seven feet in internal diameter, fitted together in segments, and bolted in lengths as they were lowered into the river bed; and after being tested with double the weight that they would be ever required to sustain, they were filled up with cement concrete. The great depth below the waterline to which these piers were sunk necessitated a much heavier description of bracing than that sent from England. The castings for these heavier braces, which were eighty-nine tons weight, were made by Messrs. James Martin & Co., of Gawler, and were fitted together at the bridge works, on a staging lowered into the water, and afterwards adjusted and fixed by the divers. So soon as the piers were filled up and the bed-stones set the girders, which had previously been put together on floating stages between the piers, were lowered on to the bed-plates by admitting water into the pontoons, which were then removed and moored in the next span, where the operation of building and fixing the girders was carried on, until all the spans were completed.

The piers consist of cast-iron cylinders in six-feet lengths, socketed together and sunk into the swamp to an average depth of about sixty feet. The cross girders are constructed of plates and angle irons, and the floor, which was composed of buckle plates, were secured to the cross-girders by suitable bearers. The work of erecting the approach occupied about twelve months, the chief difficulty being the transit of the materials, about 2,560 tons, by sea and overland, and the sinking of the cylinders. The girders were lifted into position by a " Goliath" which was carried on rails throughout the whole length of the swamp.

Droughts and flooding 

The severe droughts of 1967 to 1968, 1981 to 1983, 1991 to 1995, and 2006 to 2011 (the "Millennium drought") reduced the Murray to a trickle.

However, the major floods of 1956 and 2011 had the water reaching new record heights. There have also been major floods in 1973 to 1974 and 2016. During 2020 and 2021 the river has been flowing strongly.

References 

Murray
Murray
Bridges in South Australia
Bridges completed in 1879
Bridges completed in 1927
Road-rail bridges